Cherryvale is a historic home located near Turkey, Sampson County, North Carolina.  It was built in 1832, and is a two-story, three bay, vernacular Federal style frame dwelling.  It has a gable roof, hip roofed front porch, and exterior end chimney.  It has a hall-and-parlor plan interior.

It was added to the National Register of Historic Places in 1986.

References

Houses on the National Register of Historic Places in North Carolina
Federal architecture in North Carolina
Houses completed in 1832
Houses in Sampson County, North Carolina
National Register of Historic Places in Sampson County, North Carolina